is a female Japanese voice actress from Saitama Prefecture. She is represented with Early Wing.

Biography
Under the influence of an older sister who loved anime and manga and was aiming to become a voice actor, she came to want to become a voice actress. Tojo joined when she was in fifth grade because her friend was in a children's theater company. There was also a troupe member who appeared in the work as a voice actor and expected that "there may be a voice actor job", but only had the opportunity to perform an extra. On the other hand, she said that she was not conscious of aiming for a voice actor at this time.

When she was a junior high school student, she played a famous role in a cultural festival drama for three years, which increased her interest in the play. At first, she longed for actresses and stage actors, but aspired to be a voice actor as she can play her favorite world. she entered a training school or vocational school where she can enter from 15 years old, but she thought that might find something wanted to do other than a voice actor, she entered high school. However, the desire to become a voice actor remained the same, and entered high school after graduating from high school. At the vocational school audition, the voice actor and narrator training studio (SNT) staff of the Early Wing training school looked only at Tojo and entered.

Filmography
Bold denotes her main characters.

TV anime
 2012
Place to Place - Neko Nora 
Love, Election and Chocolate - Female student B 
Haitai Nanafa - Kahna

 2013
Day Break Illusion - Elementary school girl, girl B 
Freezing - Julia = Mumberg

 2014
Monster Retsuden Oreca Battle - Child
'Samurai Flamenco - Passerby 
Noragami - Maiden B  
Himegoto - Albertina II
Black Bullet -  Maria

2015
Urawa no Usagi-chan - Midori Sayado
Dance with Devils - Slave 
Durarara!! - Azusa Tsutsugawa, shrine maiden  
Noragami: Aragoto - Tomomi Ai
YuruYuri - Female Student B -

 2016
Scorching Ping Pong Girls - Kiruka Gote
Divine Gate - Samidare  
91 Days - Cortero (young), Phio, child, female customer 
Natsume Yūjin-chō Go - Otaka Youkai face thief 
B-Project: Kodō*Ambiguous - Utahime lunch B, boy, female A, makeup B

 2017
Hinako Note - Chiaki Hagino
Anonymous Noise - Female student 2, female MC 
Rage of Bahamut - Clerk 
Natsume Yūjin-chō Roku - Rabbit face yokai  
Love Tyrant - Shop clerk 
Anime Gatari - Yoshiko Koenji

2018
Lord of Vermilion: The Crimson King - Tachikaze Tsubasa
Ulysses: Jeanne d'Arc and the Alchemist Knight - Astaroth
Xuan Yuan Sword Luminary - Li Xiang

2019
My Roommate is a Cat - Nagisa Yasaka
Yatogame-chan Kansatsu Nikki - Hanka Jin
After School Dice Club - Hana Takayashiki
Didn't I Say to Make My Abilities Average in the Next Life?! - Aureana
Outburst Dreamer Boys - Hanaka Tsukumo
Demon Slayer: Kimetsu no Yaiba - Ozaki

2020
Yatogame-chan Kansatsu Nikki 2 Satsume - Hanka Jin

2021
Dragon Goes House-Hunting - Harpy B
PuraOre! Pride of Orange - China Yoneyama

2022
Healer Girl - Shoko Nagisa
Musashino! - Midori Saido

Anime films
 2015

 2016

Video games
 2012

 2013

 2014

 2015

 2016

 2018

 2020

 2023

Digital comics
 2014

Radio
Bold denotes that it is currently broadcast. ※internet distributed.

Radio dramas

Dubbing

Live-action
Host, Caroline (Caroline Ward)
Wire Room, Nour Holborow (Shelby Cobb)

Animation
 (Tooniverse) – Gaeun Lee/Lee Gaeun (Yeo Min-jeong)

Participation units
AGC38 – Two-dimensional Virtual Idol Unit by Asahi Production's Producer. As No. 18 Aoi Sakurakouji.
Twinkle Girls Ailes – Voice acting unit by Early Wing members. On 17 May 2015, she graduated from Twinkle Girls 5th Live Nichiyōbi wa koko kara –Start Line–.
I My Me Mine – Voice acting unit produced by Asahi Production.

Discography

Character songs

References

Notes

Sources

External links
 

1990 births
Living people
Japanese video game actresses
Japanese voice actresses
Voice actresses from Saitama Prefecture